Craig Alexander Goodwin (born 16 December 1991) is an Australian professional football player who plays for Adelaide United and the Australian national team. He is Adelaide United's all-time leading goalscorer.

Club career

Early career
He started his career playing for amateur club Munno Para City Football Club. He later signed for one of the top local Adelaide sides Adelaide Raiders who play in the South Australian Super League. After being cut during the Adelaide United youth team trials he moved to Melbourne where he signed with Victorian Premier League side Oakleigh Cannons.

Melbourne Heart
On 2 September 2011 it was announced he had signed with the Melbourne Heart youth team who play in the National Youth League. 
He made his senior professional debut for Melbourne Heart during the 2011–12 A-League campaign in a round 19 fixture against Melbourne Victory in which he received the man of the match award.

Newcastle Jets
On 7 May 2012 it was announced he had signed a two-year contract with A-League club Newcastle Jets. At Newcastle, Goodwin was known for his finishing and accurate crossing, which benefited strikers Emile Heskey and Ryan Griffiths. He scored his first A-League goal against Sydney FC on 13 October 2012. His goal proved to be the winner in a 3–2 victory. Due to his consistent amazing performances Craig was nominated for NAB Young Footballer of the Year in October. 
On 8 April 2013 Goodwin joined English Premier League side Reading on trial for two weeks.

Adelaide United
On 7 September 2014 it was announced that Goodwin had signed with hometown A-League club Adelaide United, ending a two-year stay with Newcastle Jets.

Sparta Rotterdam
On 5 May 2016, it was announced that Goodwin had signed with Dutch club Sparta Rotterdam four days after Adelaide United's A-League Championship Grand Final victory against the Western Sydney Wanderers. He made his debut on 7 August 2016 against Ajax, coming on as a substitute for Iván Calero in the 68th minute. Goodwin scored his first goal for the club a week later, scoring the second goal for Sparta Rotterdam in their 3–0 victory over PEC Zwolle. On 1 May 2018, Goodwin and Sparta Rotterdam mutually agreed to prematurely end his contract after struggling for game time.

Return to Adelaide United 
It was announced on 25 May 2018 that Goodwin had returned to Adelaide United on a 3-year contract. On 30 October 2018, he scored both of Adelaide United's goals in their FFA Cup Final victory over Sydney FC and won the Mark Viduka Medal, making him the first Australian to win the award.

Al-Wehda
On 15 July 2019, it was announced that Goodwin's buyout clause was met by Saudi Professional League side Al-Wehda for an estimated $450,000. On 17 July 2019, it was officially announced via the club's Twitter that he had signed on a two-year deal. Al-Wehda underwent a managerial change which saw a new player come in and replace Goodwin in the starting lineup, Goodwin signed a one-year contract extension and was immediately loaned out to Abha. Goodwin mutually terminated his loan with Abha over difficulties with himself and his partner living in the new city. Goodwin then returned to Adelaide United in February 2021, on a loan deal until the end of the 2020–21 A-League season. Goodwin's loan was then extended until the end of the 2021–22 A-League season.

Permanent return to Adelaide United

After two successive seasons on loan, Goodwin signed for Adelaide United on a permanent basis in July, signing a 3 year contract. On 30 October in a match against Perth Glory, Goodwin scored his 45th goal for Adelaide United which made him take the club's all-time goalscoring record outright.

International career
On 7 March 2012, Goodwin was selected to represent the Australia Olympic football team in an Asian Olympic Qualifier match against Iraq.

Goodwin made his international debut for Australia on 26 July 2013, coming on as a late substitute in a loss to Japan at the 2013 EAFF East Asian Cup. He started the next match of the tournament, playing a full game in a 4–3 loss to China.

On 27 January 2022, he scored his first international goal against Vietnam in the 2022 FIFA World Cup qualification as Australia won 4–0 in Melbourne.

He was named in Australia's squad for the 2022 FIFA World Cup in November 2022. On 22 November 2022, Goodwin scored his second international goal and Australia's first World Cup goal from open play since the 2014 World Cup, in a 1–4 loss against France. In the last sixteen, his deflected strike, ultimately credited as an Argentine own goal, halved the deficit in a 1–2 loss against eventual champions Argentina in Australia's round of 16 match.

Career statistics

International

Honours 
Adelaide United
 A-League Championship: 2015–16
 A-League Premiership: 2015–16
 FFA Cup: 2018

Individual
 Adelaide United All-time leading goal scorer
 PFA A-League Team of the Season: 2021–22
 Adelaide United Player of the Year: 2015–16
 Mark Viduka Medal: 2018
A-Leagues All Star: 2022

References

External links

1991 births
Living people
Soccer players from Adelaide
Australian soccer players
Australian expatriate soccer players
Association football defenders
Association football forwards
Australia international soccer players
Croydon Kings players
Melbourne City FC players
Newcastle Jets FC players
Adelaide United FC players
Sparta Rotterdam players
Al-Wehda Club (Mecca) players
Abha Club players
A-League Men players
Saudi Professional League players
FFSA Super League players
Eredivisie players
Expatriate footballers in Saudi Arabia
Australian expatriate sportspeople in Saudi Arabia
2022 FIFA World Cup players